Banca is a commune of the Pyrénées-Atlantiques department in the Nouvelle-Aquitaine region of south-western France. It is part of the former province of Lower Navarre.

Banca is part of Pays Quint (Kintoa in Basque or Quinto Real in Spanish), an area of pasture area which belongs to Spain but is cultivated by French farmers.

The inhabitants of the commune are known as Bankars.

Geography
Banca is located in the Aldudes valley on the banks of the Nive des Aldudes some 15 km south-west of Saint-Jean-Pied-de-Port. The western and eastern borders of the commune are the national frontier between France and Spain. Access to the commune is by the D948 road from Saint-Étienne-de-Baïgorry in the north which passes through the commune and the village and continues south-west to Aldudes. There are no crossing points in the commune to Spain. The commune is mainly rugged alpine pastures.

Hydrography
The Nive des Aldudes flows from Aldudes in the south-west, gathering tributaries such as the Antchignoko Erreka, the Ruisseau d'Hayra, the Latcharrako Erreka, and the Belechiko Erreka on the northern border, and continues north-east to join the Nive south of Saint-Martin-d'Arrossa. The Ruisseau d'Hayra rises in the south of the commune and flows north gathering tributaries such as the Lehaltzarteko Erreka, the Caminarteko Erreka, and the Legarzuko Erreka to join the Nive des Aldudes near the village.

Places and Hamlets

 Achistoy
 Agnesto
 Amosta
 Antcharteko Borda
 Antcheigno
 Antcholako Etchola
 Antonénéa
 Apialépoa
 Ardaza
 Argaray
 Argaray (wood)
 Arrabit
 Array
 Artéko Borda
 Asundreykoborda
 Atchaurra
 Ausquiénéa
 Barberaénéa
 Barnetchia
 Basoritz
 Beguibelcha
 Behostemetaka
 Berginanto
 Berhain (pass)
 Betripeillonénéa
 Betrizina
 Bichar
 Bidabéheréa
 Bihurrieta
 Bordacharréa
 Bustanénéa
 Cardinalia
 Carminatéko Borda
 Chabukody Lépoa
 Champagne
 Chanchoénéa
 Changala
 Chaochako Kaskoa
 Chasperro
 Chinta
 Chiriatéguia
 Chuhy
 Churritcheguy
 Cocagaïchto
 Colomio
 Curutcheko Kaskoa
 Curutchetako Borda
 Dartépé
 Dominé
 Ehuntzaroy (pass, 971m)
 Elhorrieta (pass, 831m)
 Elichaldia
 Erdizako Borda
 Erreguéréa
 Errekaénéa
 Erremerreka
 Errolako Ithurria
 Esculeguy
 Etcheberria
 Eyhérazaïna
 Eyhérazaïnako Borda>
 Fagaldénéa
 Galant
 Gathuly Béhéréa
 Gathulyko Ithurria
 Gnafarénéa
 Gnimigno
 Golko
 Golomio Ithurria
 Goroldi
 Gorria
 Gosnaisto
 Guichonaenea
 Guildeizar
 Guzmuztiko Borda
 Halzéta
 Harguintoa
 Harrigaitzeko Kaskoa
 Harrigorri
 Harzia
 Hauzay
 Hayra
 Hayra (forest)
 Hayra Sar
 Hortz Zorrotz (rocks)
 Ilharragorria
 Ilharragorrikomalda
 Indiano
 Iramebako Borda
 Iramehaca
 Irausta
 Ithurrialde Béhéréa
 Ithurrialde Garaya
 Jaureguibeheréa
 Joanes Ederra
 Jokutako Lépoa
 Katchaenéa
 Labaquia
 Lechéa
 Legarzuko Borda
 Legaza (mill)
 Lehaltzarte
 Lekayoénéa
 Lepeder
 Lepobelcha
 Lezetako Lépoa
 Lindus
 Manechénéa
 Maneixhandy
 Marieyhéra
 Maristola Ithurria
 Maritcho
 Marmaroa
 Martinbelchénéa
 Matchin Ithurria
 Meharroztegui (pass, 738m)
 Mehatzé (pass, 1133m)
 Menta
 Minchendo
 Mizpira (pass, 832m)
 Mizparachar (pass, 1139m)
 Moroinborda
 Mutikoénéa
 Musquet
 Ohakoa
 Olapideko Etchola
 Olhaberrieta
 Ondarlako Ithurria
 Orkastia
 Otsachar
 Otsahartéa
 Otsarrapeguy
 Otsartéa
 Oyhançaro
 Pago Zelhay (pass, 888m)
 Peilloénéa
 Peilloeneko Borda
 Petanénéa
 Petechaénéa
 Premonio
 Tchipitcho Etchola
 Teylary or Nahala (pass, 932m)
 Tipitto
 Todoria
 Turitchia
 Uhaillen Borda
 Uhaldéa
 Urbaztarréa
 Urlabéhéréa
 Urlagaraya
 Urritzolahandiko Etchola
 Uzkalépoa
 Zaku
 Zakuko Borda
 Zubiarin
 Zubiarinzahar
 Zumazoko

Climate

Toponymy
The commune name in Basque is Banka.

For John-Baptiste Orpustan, the origin of the name Banca can have two interpretations: one lent from the Spanish banco designating the bench on which money was exchanged (which gave the French word banque which gave the English bank) or two from bancs de pierre (stone benches).

The following table details the origins of the commune name and other names in the commune.

Sources:
Orpustan: Jean-Baptiste Orpustan,   New Basque Toponymy
Cassini: Cassini Map from 1750
Ldh/EHESS/Cassini: 
Raymond: Topographic Dictionary of the Department of Basses-Pyrenees, 1863, on the page numbers indicated in the table.

History

Banca owes its origin to the revival in the 18th century of the copper mines which had operated in ancient times. Banca was known as Le Fonderie (The Foundry) until the 19th century" and, under the Ancien Régime, it was a hamlet or district under the parish of Saint-Étienne-de-Baïgorry. It was not made a commune until 1793 under the same name, then in 1874 it was renamed "Banca". The remains of a large forge, a steel foundry started in 1828 on the site of the former copper smelter, stands at the entrance of the village on the banks of the Nive des Aldudes. The most visible element is a blast furnace in good condition.

The first armed action by Iparretarrak took place in Banca on 11 December 1973.

Administration

List of Successive Mayors

Inter-communality
The commune is part of four inter-communal structures:
 the Communauté d'agglomération du Pays Basque;
 the inter-communal association for the development and management of the slaughterhouse in Saint-Jean-Pied-de-Port;
 the association to support Basque culture.
 the joint association for the drainage basin of the Nive;

Demography
In 2017 the commune had 346 inhabitants.

Economy

The copper/silver mines and the associated smelter reached their peak in the middle of the 18th century and the forge, with its blast furnace, was in operation from 1828 to 1861.

Economic activity is now mainly agricultural. The town is part of the Appellation d'origine contrôlée (AOC) zone of Ossau-iraty.

Culture and heritage

Civil heritage
The commune has a number of buildings and structures that are registered as historical monuments:
The Banca Mine on D948 (19th century). These remains are at the northern entrance of the village including a blast furnace. The supply canal is fed by the waters of the Nive captured upstream and turn a wheel of a blower machine which injected air at the base of the blast furnace through two nozzles. The adjacent building, still dominated by the canal, housed the forge fires and hammers to make cast iron and a splitting mill for splitting iron bars.
Houses and Farms (19th century)
The Redoubt of Lindus (1813). This redoubt was used during the Franco-Spanish War 1813–1814.
The Gorria Farmhouse (now a Stable) (18th century)
The Gixonaenea Farmhouse (1808)
The Xangala Farmhouse (19th century)

Religious heritage

The Parish Church of Saint Peter (19th century) is registered as an historical monument.

Environmental heritage
The Petechanea Gallery (0.1 hectares) is one of the locations of the regional conservatory of natural areas of the Pyrenees.
Mountain Peaks
Mount Harrigorry 806 m
Munhogain 853 m
Otsamunho 901 m
Errola 908 m
Abraku 1003 m
Ichtauz 1024 m
Antchola 1119 m
Mehatzé 1209 m
Lindus 1220 m
Mendimotcha 1224 m
Aurigna 1278 m

Facilities

Education
The commune has a primary school.

Sports
There is a Fronton traversed by a road.

See also
Communes of the Pyrénées-Atlantiques department

Bibliography
Mines and Metallurgical Establishments of Banca, dir. P. Machot, J&D, Biarritz, Izpegi, Saint-Étienne-de-Baïgorry, 1995, 306 p. 
Pierre Machot and Gilles Parent, "Mines and Metallurgy in the Valley of Baïgorry", in The Valley of Baïgorry, Éditions Izpegi, reprinted in 2002 
Gilles Parent, "The handiwork of the Copper Foundry of Banca in the 18th century" in Revue d'Histoire Industrielle des Pyrénées Occidentales, No. 2, 2007, p. 143–222, Éditions Izpegi

References

Communes of Pyrénées-Atlantiques
Lower Navarre